Shlisselburgsky (masculine), Shlisselburgskaya (feminine), or Shlisselburgskoye (neuter) may refer to:
Shlisselburgskoye Urban Settlement, a municipal formation corresponding to Shlisselburgskoye Settlement Municipal Formation, an administrative division of Kirovsky District of Leningrad Oblast, Russia
Shlisselburgsky Uyezd (1755–1923), an administrative division of Saint Petersburg Governorate in the Russian Empire and the early Russian SFSR